"R.P.M." is a song by South African-American singer Sasha Pieterse. The single, accompanied by a music video, was released on June 13, 2013.

Background and release
 The music video released on June 13, 2013. The video was directed by Matt Steele.

Credits and personnel

Video cast
Vocals and background vocals – Sasha Pieterse 
Boyfriend - Alexander Suarez
Drums – Matt Davis
Guitar – Dan Franklin
Bass – Allee Fütterer
Fiddle – Lauren Baba
Songwriting – Pieterse, Matt Steele
Production – Steele, Dan Franklin

Music video
Director – Matt Steele
Executive Producers – Sasha Pieterse, Dan Franklin, Matt Steele
Location Sound – Johnny Kubelka
Grip – Hudson Sheaffer
Makeup – Kristina Goldberg
Hair – Jeanie Duronsiet
Driver – Bill Diaz
Wardrobe consideration – Threadsence
Equipment consideration – Carvin, Divided by 13, Orybon Drums, Hollywood Sound

Chart Positions 
The song debuted in Brazil, France at 91.

Track listing
Digital download 
"R.P.M." – 3:31

References

2013 singles
2013 songs
Sasha Pieterse songs